Allianz Global Investors (commonly called AllianzGI or AGI), is a global investment management firm with offices in over 20 locations worldwide. It is owned by the global financial services group Allianz. Employing nearly 3,000, it manages over EUR 500 billion in assets on behalf of institutional, retail clients and also of Allianz itself.
AGI became known for one of the biggest fraud cases in which its Structured Alpha fund lost over 6 billion dollars in the 2020 market sell-off. As the risk profile of the fund was missold to the investors it led to charges against the company and its managers.

Leadership 
Tobias C. Pross is Chief Executive Officer (CEO) of Allianz Global Investors, a position he has held since the start of 2020. Prior to 2020, Allianz Global Investors was led by founding CEOs Andreas Utermann and Elizabeth Corley.

History 
Allianz first created a separate asset management business in 1998 under the leadership of board member, Joachim Faber.  Through a combination of asset management acquisitions as well as acquisitions of other businesses that had asset management units, Allianz established a large asset management division comprising different investment ‘boutiques’.

By 2010 the Allianz asset management division, going under the name of Allianz Global Investors by then had reached EUR 1500bn. In 2011, a decision was taken to combine most of the different investment managers into a globally integrated asset manager; from 2012 Allianz moved to what they call a “two pillar” model where Allianz Global Investors and PIMCO operate separately from each other despite common ownership.

When Allianz Global Investors was established as an integrated asset manager in 2012, it was managing EUR 279bn in assets. By March 2019, assets under management were EUR 535bn; these assets were split between investments in equity (25%), fixed income (35%), multi asset (26%) and alternatives (14%).

Structured Alpha Fraud 
During the March 2020 market sell-off, the Structured Alpha funds lost over 7 billion USD leading to accusation that the funds mislead investors (such as pension funds) about their risk profile. While the fund claimed that it used hedging to protect against market crashes, no such hedging was actually employed and the fund produced manipulated reports. 
On August 1, 2021, the United States Department of Justice began a probe into Allianz Global's Structured Alpha Funds with the German Federal Financial Supervisory Authority launching an investigation later in 2021.
Additional lawsuits were filed by investors such as American public pension funds, including New York City Subway employees and employees of the City of Milwaukee. In 2022 Allianz pleaded guilty to criminal securities fraud and agreed to pay over 6 billion USD in one of the largest cases so far. The funds former manager. Gregoire Tournant, is being indicted for fraud, conspiracy and obstruction and two other portfolio managers, Stephen Bond-Nelson and Trevor Taylor, pleaded guilty to charges of fraud and conspiracy.

References

External links
Company home page

Allianz
Investment management companies of Germany
Financial services companies established in 1998